Mia Žnidarič (born 9 December 1962) is a Slovenian jazz singer.

History 
Mia's jazz career started, when Mia met Slovenian composer and actor Nino de Gleria at age 27. Mia has moved from Maribor to Ljubljana with him and started singing jazz at bars. She took solo singing lessons with Nada Žgur and Jasna Spiller. She met Vinci Vogue Anžlovar, who asked her to sing in his movie Babica gre na jug, which made Mia recognisable to wider audience. She used to hold concerts in a popular discothèque Turist in the center of Ljubljana. In 1996, she was awarded for her albums Hold My Hand, and the year after for her second album I wish I Know How. Mia has met her husband American piano player Steve Klink when she was 32 years old. The success of their relationship results in their albums Hold My Hand and a few years after Pobarvanka. Currently Mia has concerts with Steve Klink trio in Slovenia and abroad.

Discography 
 Hold My Hand (1995)
 I Wish I Knew How (1996)
 Pobarvanka (1997)
 Iskre (2000)
 Kaj ti je deklica (2000)
 My Favorite Things / A si ti al nisi ti moj ljubi (2003)
 Preblizu predaleč (2004)
 Nevidni orkester (2008)
 Love you madly (2011)

References 

1961 births
Slovenian jazz singers
Living people
21st-century Slovenian women singers
People from the Municipality of Ruše
20th-century Slovenian women singers